County of Washington v. Gunther, 452 U.S. 161 (1981), is a United States labor law case concerning discrimination and the lower standards of protection for gender pay because of the Bennett Amendment in Title VII of the Civil Rights Act of 1964, §703(h).

Background
In 1974, four female county prison guards sued the County of Washington in Oregon for being paid less than male guards and argued that to be unlawful sexual discrimination. The county argued that male guards spent more time overseeing prisoners and clerical tasks. It also argued that under the Bennett Amendment, the women could claim unlawful pay discrimination unless they showed under the Fair Labor Standards Act that they were doing "equal work."

Judgment

District Court
The district court found that male guards were responsible for overseeing more prisoners and also that female guards spent some of their time in clerical tasks. However, it also found as a matter of law that a sex-based wage discrimination claim cannot be brought under Title VII unless it satisfies the equal work standard of the Equal Pay Act of 1963.

Ninth Circuit Court of Appeals
While not reviewing the first finding, the Ninth Circuit Court of Appeals held with respect to the latter that "claims for sex-based wage discrimination can also be brought under Title VII even though no member of the opposite sex holds an equal but higher paying job, provided that the challenged wage rate is not exempted under the Equal Pay Act's affirmative defenses as to wage differentials attributable to seniority, merit, quantity or quality of production, or any other factor other than sex." It interpreted the intention of the amendment as incorporating "into Title VII only the affirmative defenses of the Equal Pay Act, not its prohibitory language requiring equal pay for equal work."

Supreme Court
The US Supreme Court held that the women were not precluded from bringing a discrimination claim in principle, and they did not need to show they were doing strictly equal work. That left open the possibility to claim that work was of comparable value. Justice Brennan, speaking for the Court, indicated in the majority opinion that the Bennett Amendment did not preclude comparison of differences in pay but only those attributable to those four specific factors:

Rehnquist J (joined by Burger, Stewart and Powell) dissented:

Significance
Gunther did not prove definitive. The Court did not determine how jobs might be properly compared, and one of the primary opponents of the majority opinion was soon-to-be Chief Justice of the United States William Rehnquist. Rehnquist wrote explicitly against the comparable worth theory in his dissent (speaking as well for Warren E. Burger, Lewis F. Powell, Jr. and Potter Stewart), and Brennan countered that the majority opinion did not explicitly or implicitly support or refute the comparable worth doctrine. Gutman underscored that "the Gunther ruling did not validate comparable worth theory; it merely permitted plaintiffs to try to make the prima facie claim under Title VII rules." It added, "So far plaintiffs have been thwarted in every case."

See also

US labor law

References

External links
 

1981 in United States case law
United States labor case law
United States Supreme Court cases
United States Supreme Court cases of the Burger Court